Ivan Čarnogurský (27 May 1933 – 9 November 2022) was a Slovak businessman and politician. A member of the Christian Democratic Movement, he served in the Chamber of People from June to December 1992.

He was the brother of the first prime minister of Slovakia Ján Čarnogurský.

Čarnogurský died in Bratislava on 9 November 2022, at the age of 89.

References

1933 births
2022 deaths
Christian Democratic Movement politicians
Members of the Chamber of the People of Czechoslovakia (1992)
Slovak businesspeople
University of Economics in Bratislava alumni
Slovak University of Technology in Bratislava alumni
Politicians from Bratislava